Hyundai Mipo Dockyard is one of the largest shipbuilding companies with world share rank 1 (50%) in PC (Product Carrier). Since the 1980s, more than 10,000 ships were repaired and converted until 2005 and 400 newly ordered ships were delivered until 2009. It delivers about 70 new ships in a year by Hyundai Mipo Dockyard. The delivered amount is over 1 million CGT in a year (2007), making it 4th in the world. Its product mix is shipbuilding (96.4%) and conversion and repair (3.6%). Hyundai Mipo Dockyard is a member of Hyundai Heavy Industries Group and was listed on KOSPI (Korea Composite Stock Price Index) in 1983.

Founding
1975 04 Founded on the HHI premises
1982 12 Constructed New Shipyard at Present Location
1983 12 listed on KOSPI (Korea Composite Stock Price Index)
1999 04 completed Hyundai-Vinashin Shipyard in Vietnam
2003 12 MR PC, Selected as 'World-Class Product'
2005 04 completed Daebul Factory in Junnam, South Korea
2005 12 completed Jangsaengpo Factory in Ulsan, South Korea
2006 12 Sub-Panamax Containership, Selected as 'World-Class Product'
2008 12 Won US Dollars 2 Billion Export Prize
2009 12 Awarded 3 Billion US dollars Export Prize
2010 10 Acquired a Greenhouse Gas Inspection Certificate

Shipbuilding
1983 11 Built Cable Layer (ITM Venturer) for UK
1986 10 Built Reefer Vessel (Summer Sky) for USA
1997 12 Delivered FPSO (Ramform Banf) for Norway
2001 02 Delivered Pipe Laying Ship (CSO Deep Blue) for France
2002 05 Delivered car ferry (Seonghee) for Korea
2009 04 Delivered 400th new ordered ships
2011 01 HVS entered into newbuilding business 
2013 07 Delivered the 700th newbuild vessel
2014 01 Delivered Platform Supply Vessel for BP
2020 07 Order for passenger/vehicle ferry (MV Manxman) for Isle of Man Steam Packet Company

Conversion and repair
1980 12 Received 3 Conversion Ships (from CMCR)
1981 01 Received 8 Conversion Ships (from OOCL)
1981 12 Received 2 LNG Conversion Ships
1984 06 Entering 2,000th Repair Ships to Docks
1987 10 Entering 3,000th Repair Ships to Docks
1995 02 Delivered 2,000th Conversion Ships 
1995 10 Repaired 6,000th Ships
2005 04 Repaired 8,000th Ships

Awards
1999 Shiprepair Yard Award by Lloyd's List Maritime Asia 
2000 Shiprepair Yard Award by Lloyd's List Maritime Asia
2001 The Shipbuilding Award by Lloyd's List Maritime Asia 
2002 Shiprepair Yard Award by Lloyd's List Maritime Asia
2003 MR PC, Selected as 'World-Class Product'
2004 Best Management Practices by AsiaMoney 
2006 Sub-Panamax Containership, Selected as 'World-Class Product'
2008 Won US Dollars 2 Billion Export Prize
2009 Awarded 3 Billion US dollards Export Prize
2012 Con-Ro Carrier, Selected as 'World-Class Product' by the Korean Government
2013 Asphalt Carrier, Selected as 'World-Class Product' by the Korean Government

Quality
1997 ISO 9001 
2000 ISO 9001
2003 ISO 14001 by LRQA (Lloyd's Register Quality Assurance)
2003 OHSAS 18001 (Occu-pational Health & Safety Management System)

Soccer team
Hyundai Group have 3 Soccer Teams
Hyundai Motors: Jeonbuk Hyundai Motors (Champion of 2006 AFC Champions League)
Hyundai Heavy :    Ulsan Hyundai Horang-i (Champion of 2005 K-League and 2006 A3 Champions Cup)
Hyundai Mipo :     Dolphin Football Club (Champion of  2003, 04, 07, 08 K-2 National League)
1998 Dolphin Football Club Established by Hyundai Mipo Dockyard
2003 Winner of the Semifinals (Hyundai Motors Cup, K-2 League)
2004 Winner of the Semifinals (Hyundai Motors Cup, K-2 League)
2005 Winner of the Semifinals (2005 Hana Bank, FA Cup)
2006 Winner of the Semifinals (Nantional League)
2007 Winner of Nantional League
2008 Winner of Nantional Leagu

See also
 Hyundai Heavy Industries
 Hyundai Heavy Industries Group
 Hyundai Group
 Ulsan Hyundai Mipo Dockyard Dolphin FC

References

External links
 Hyundai Mipo Dockyard official site

Hyundai Heavy Industries Group
Shipbuilding companies of South Korea